Simba waterfall is located in Mahankal Rural Municipality, Lalitpur about 50 km from Kathmandu between Rigin Danda and Manikhel Khawa. The fall lies at an altitude of 2000 m, and it has five cascades. ‘Simba’ means cold in Tamang language.

There is also a temple of Saraswati on the way to Lele from the fall.

See also
List of waterfalls of Nepal

References

Waterfalls of Nepal